Hakea subsulcata is a shrub in the family Proteacea and endemic to an area in the  Wheatbelt, Great Southern and the Goldfields-Esperance regions of Western Australia. It is an upright, broom-like shrub with needle-shaped leaves and purple-pink flowers from winter to early spring.

Description
The smaller branches are thickly covered in flattened soft hairs at flowering time. The branches with flowers are smooth. The leaves have scattered flattened soft hairs or are smooth with 12 longitudinal veins the length of the leaf. The inflorescence is a spherical shaped umbel of about 50 large purplish, mauve or creamy-white flowers on bare wood or  occasionally below leaves and rarely in leaf axils and partially covered by dense foliage. Flowering occurs from May to September.

Taxonomy and naming
Hakea subsulcata was first formally described in 1845 by Carl Meisner and the description was published in Plantae Preissianae.  It is named from the Latin sub - somewhat, and sulcatus - grooved, referring to the leaf structure.

Distribution and habitat
This species grows from Wyalkatchem through to Gnowangerup and south to Ravensthorpe. Grows in heath, scrub and woodland in well-drained clay, various coloured sands and loam over laterite, often with gravel, occasionally on ridges. An ornamental species, may be used for hedging and low windbreak.

Conservation status
Hakea subsulcata is classified as "not threatened" by the Western Australian Government.

References

subsulcata
Eudicots of Western Australia
Plants described in 1845
Taxa named by Carl Meissner